Sultan Inayat Zakiatudin Syah (c. 1645 - 3 October 1688) was the sixteenth monarch of the Acèh Darussalam and the third sulṭāna regnant to rule in succession. Her reign lasted from 1678 to 1688 and was generally peaceful.

Background and enthronement

Her original name was Puteri Raja Setia. There are conflicting versions about her family background, which is not revealed by contemporary archival sources. According to the relatively reliable chronicle Bustanus Salatin she was the daughter of an otherwise unknown Sultan Muhamed Syah. Three minor chronicles assert that she was the daughter of her predecessor Nurul Alam Naqiatuddin Syah. A third source, a manuscript from Universiti Kebangsaan Malaysia, says that she was sired by Malik Radliat Syah, son of Sultan Firman Ali Ri'ayat Syah, son of Sultan Alauddin Ri'ayat Syah Sayyid al-Mukammal. The English sea captain William Dampier visited Aceh during her reign and wrote: "the queen of Achin as it is said, is always an old maid chosen out of the Royal family". When the old queen Nurul Alam died in January 1678, Puteri Raja Setia was enthroned under the name Sultanah Inayat Zakiatuddin Syah without any known commotion. According to an English travel account from 1684 she was around 40 years old, large with a powerful voice. The visitors even speculated that she was no real woman but actually a eunuch in disguise.

Communication with visitors

Like the first sultana, Taj ul-Alam, Inayat had cultural interests and supported the well-known Islamic scholar Abdul Ra'uf of Singkel. At least one of his works, a commentary on Nawawi's hadiths, was commissioned by the queen. In 1683 she was visited by an embassy from the sharif of Mecca which reached Aceh after failing to contact the Mughal emperor Aurangzeb. English envoys from Madras arrived in 1684 and asked for permission to establish a trading post. They had bought Acehnese pepper since long and searched for new posts on Banten after Java had been closed to them in 1682 by Amangkurat II of Mataram. At this time the council of the queen consisted of twelve orang kayas (lit. rich men) who received the Europeans friendly. The Englishmen pointed out that a fortified post would deter the Dutch East India Company from enforcing a blockade on the Acehnese coast. Still the proposal was not approved by the court. The English observed that Aceh had become a popular port for Indian traders, Madras residents and adventurers in the past decade.

Sultana Inayat died on 3 October 1688. Her death was followed by a brief spate of infighting among the orang kayas before a fourth (and last) sultana was enthroned. This was Sultana Kamalat Syah.

References

Literature

 Djajadiningrat, Raden Hoesein (1911) 'Critisch overzicht van de in Maleische werken vervatte gegevens over de geschiedenis van het soeltanaat van Atjeh', Bijdragen tot de Taal-, Land- en Volkenkunde 65, pp. 135–265.
 Encyclopaedie van Nederlandsch-Indië (1917), Vol. 1. 's Grabenhage & Leiden: M. Nijhoff & Brill.
 Hasjmy, A. (1977) 59 tahun Aceh merdeka dibawah pemerintahan ratu. Jakarta: Bulan Bintang.
 Khan, Sher Banu (2009) Rule Behind the Silk Curtain: The Sultanahs of Aceh, 1641-1699. PhD Thesis, University of London.
 Khan, Sher Banu (2010) 'The sultanahs of Aceh, 1641-99', in Arndt Graaf et al. (eds), Aceh: History, Politics and Culture. Singapore: ISEAS, pp. 3–25.
 Ricklefs, Merle C. (1994) A History of Modern Indonesia Since c. 1300, 2nd ed. Stanford: Stanford University Press.

Sultans of Aceh
17th-century women rulers
1640s births
1688 deaths
17th-century Indonesian women